Criminales de guerra (English: War criminals) is a 1946 Argentine documentary film directed by Júpiter Perruzi. The film was made by excerpts of international news programs who covered the Nuremberg Trials.  Additional commentaries and illustrative maps are also shown.

References 

1946 films
1940s Spanish-language films
Argentine black-and-white films
Argentine documentary films
1946 documentary films
1940s Argentine films